The Carolina Hurricanes are an American professional ice hockey team based in Raleigh, North Carolina. They play in the Metropolitan Division of the Eastern Conference in the National Hockey League (NHL). The team joined the NHL in 1979 as an expansion team as the Hartford Whalers, but moved to Raleigh, North Carolina in 1997. Having first played at the Greensboro Coliseum, the Hurricanes have played their home games at the PNC Arena, which was first named the Raleigh Entertainment & Sports Arena, since 1999. There have been nine general managers in franchise history since entering the NHL.

Key

General managers

See also
List of NHL general managers

Notes
 A running total of the number of general managers of the franchise. Thus any general manager who has two or more separate terms as general manager is only counted once. WHA general managers are not counted towards the total.

References

Carolina Hurricanes
 
Carolina Hurricanes general managers
general
general